Barbara McGuire may refer to:

 Barbara McGuire (artist), American artist
 Barbara McGuire (politician), American politician from Arizona